Louise Boitard (20 May 1907 – 4 April 2001), also known as Jeanine Boitard and Jeanine Gille, was a member of the French Resistance during the Second World War. Later a local politician, she was one of France's most decorated women.

Career in the Resistance
Boitard, the daughter of a wine merchant, joined the Resistance in 1941, becoming known by the code name "Jeanine". She helped many people to escape from occupied France. In October 1943, she hid two small Jewish children at a farm near Lisieux. In 1944, during the invasion of Normandy, she rescued a Canadian airman, Jack Verbout, and hid him in her home. A character based on Jeanine appeared in the film The Longest Day, played by Irina Demick. When the film was released in 1962, she travelled to Chicago to meet Verbout again.

Post-war activity

Immediately after the war, she married Léonard Gille, a lawyer and Resistance worker whose secretary she had been since 1940. She was a board member of the weekly publication Liberté de Normandie. In 1945 she went to Sweden to work with childcare experts, subsequently setting up several crèches to support families separated by the war.

On 18 April 1971, Jeanine Gille became the first woman to sit on the conseil général of Calvados, in succession to her husband, who had died two months earlier. She was re-elected in 1973, but defeated by eight votes in 1979.

She was buried beside her husband in the cemetery at Poirier, in the commune of Frénouville, east of Caen. In 2015, the "square Jeanine Boitard" was named after her, in the Saint-Paul district of Caen.

Références

1907 births
2001 deaths
20th-century French politicians
French Resistance members
20th-century French women politicians